White Escarpment is an escarpment in the west part of the Heritage Range, extending for 15 nautical miles (28 km) between the heads of the Splettstoesser and Dobbratz Glaciers. Named by the University of Minnesota Geological Party to these mountains, 1963–64, for Chief Warrant Officer Ronald B. White, pilot with the 62nd Transportation Detachment, who assisted the party.

References

Escarpments of Antarctica
Landforms of Ellsworth Land
Geography of the British Antarctic Territory